The 3rd London Trophy was a motor race, run to Formula One rules, held on 30 July 1955 at Crystal Palace Circuit, London. The race was run over two heats of 10 laps and a final of 15 laps, and was won by British driver Mike Hawthorn in a Maserati 250F. Hawthorn started from pole position in Heat 1 and set fastest lap in the heat, and also in the final. Vanwall driver Harry Schell started from pole position in Heat 2 and set fastest lap in that heat. Schell was second in the final and Roy Salvadori in a Maserati 250F was third.

Despite most Internet sources describing this race as the London Trophy, it really should be called the International Trophy (not to be confused with the BRDC International Trophy). The actual London Trophy was a Formula Libre race also held at Crystal Palace on 30 May 1955 and was won by Peter Collins in a Maserati 250F.

Entries

1Numbers 4, 14 and 22 DNA

Results

Heats

Final
Grid positions for the final were determined by the drivers' finishing times in the heats. Only the top six drivers from each heat qualified for the final.

References 

London
London